Fatehpur Union is a union of Hathazari Upazila of Chittagong District, Bangladesh.

Geography
Total area:

Location 
North: Mekhal Union

East: North Madarsha Union

South: Chikandandi Union

West: Sitakunda Upazila

Population 
According to the 2011 Bangladesh census, Fatehpur Union had a total population of 45,500 with 23,582 Males and 21,918 Females.

Marketplaces and bazaars 
Madanhat, Islamiahat, Nondirhat, 1 No. Railgate Bazaar, South Campus Bou Bazaar, and Chittagong University 2 No. Gate Bazaar

Education 
 Chittagong University
 Fatehpur Mehernega High School (established 1968)

References

http://fatehpurup.chittagong.gov.bd/site/page/9d750a7f-2144-11e7-8f57-286ed488c766/এক-নজরে 

Unions of Hathazari Upazila